Hari Manjhi (born 28 January 1963) is an Indian politician who formerly represented Gaya Lok Sabha seat in the Parliament of India. He was also a member of the 15th Lok Sabha. He is a leader of the Bharatiya Janata Party.

Positions held 
2005-09 	Member, Bihar Legislative Assembly
2009 	Elected to 15th Lok Sabha
31 Aug. 2009 	Member, Committee on Labour
	Member, Consultative Committee, Ministry of Food Processing Industries
	Chairman, Vigilance and Monitoring Committee, Ministry of Rural Development, Govt. of India, Gaya
May, 2014 	Re-elected to 16th Lok Sabha (2nd term)
1 Sep. 2014 onwards 	Member, Committee on Absence of Members from the Sittings of the House
	Member, Standing Committee on Labour
	Member, Consultative Committee, Ministry of Coal

1963 births
Living people
People from Gaya, India
India MPs 2009–2014
Lok Sabha members from Bihar
Bharatiya Janata Party politicians from Bihar
India MPs 2014–2019